James Matthew Connor (born May 11, 1863 in Port Jervis, New York) was an American professional  Major League Baseball player. Connor was 29 years old when he broke into the big leagues on July 11, 1892, with the Chicago Colts. He did not play in the majors again until 1897. Connor's last game was August 9, 1899 with the Chicago Orphans. He played in the minors from 1887 through 1908, including a stint as player/manager in the Hudson River League in 1907. James Connor died on August 3, 1950 in Providence, Rhode Island. Connor is buried at Mount Saint Mary Cemetery, Pawtucket, Rhode Island. 

In 293 games over four seasons, Connor posted a .233 batting average (247-for-1058) with 117 runs, 3 home runs and 129 RBI.

External links

 Baseball Almanac

1863 births
1950 deaths
Major League Baseball second basemen
Baseball players from Rhode Island
People from Port Jervis, New York
Chicago Colts players
Chicago Orphans players
19th-century baseball players
Minor league baseball managers
Salem Fairies players
Buffalo Bisons (minor league) players
London Tecumsehs (baseball) players
Manchester Amskoegs players
Joliet Convicts players
Atlanta Windjammers players
Toledo White Stockings players
Toledo Swamp Angels players
Terre Haute Hottentots players
Minneapolis Millers (baseball) players
Providence Clamdiggers (baseball) players
Providence Grays (minor league) players
Albany Senators players
Montreal Royals players
Toronto Maple Leafs (International League) players
Fall River Indians players
Lowell Tigers players
Lynn Shoemakers players
Burials in Rhode Island